Rose Hill is an unincorporated community in Darke County, in the U.S. state of Ohio.

History
The first settlement at Rose Hill was made in the 1830s.  Rose Hill was laid out in 1852. A post office called Rose Hill was established in 1863, and remained in operation until 1904.

References

Unincorporated communities in Darke County, Ohio
Unincorporated communities in Ohio